Silent Night, Bloody Night: The Homecoming is a 2013 British slasher film and remake of the 1972 American film Silent Night, Bloody Night.

Plot 
Jeffrey inherits his grandfather's abandoned home and arrives in town to negotiate its sale. No one knows an ax-wielding maniac lives in the house and does not like strangers.

Cast 
 Adrienne King as the mysterious voice
 Alan Humphreys as Jeffrey Butler
 Mel Stevens as Diane Adams
 Sabrina Dickens as Marianne Butler
 Philip Harvey as Wilfred Butler

See also
 Silent Night, Bloody Night 2: Revival, sequel to the original film

References

External links 
 
 

2013 horror films
2013 films
2010s English-language films
Horror film remakes
2010s Christmas horror films
British Christmas horror films
2010s British films